"Get to Me" is a song by the American rock band Train, for their third album, My Private Nation. It was released in 2005 as the third and final single for the album. It was featured in a Cingular commercial. It is also directly inspired by Oleta Adam’s “GET HERE” with lyrics almost parodying hers.

Charts

References

2005 singles
Train (band) songs
Song recordings produced by Brendan O'Brien (record producer)
Songs written by Pat Monahan
2005 songs